Béatrice Kamboulé (born 25 February 1980) is a Burkinabé athlete who competes in the 100 metres hurdles, long jump, triple jump as well as the heptathlon.

She competed in the 100 metres hurdles at the 2011 World Championships without qualifying for the semifinals.

Competition record

References

1980 births
Living people
Burkinabé long jumpers
Burkinabé female hurdlers
Burkinabé female triple jumpers
Burkinabé heptathletes
Burkinabé female sprinters
Female long jumpers
African Games bronze medalists for Burkina Faso
African Games medalists in athletics (track and field)
Athletes (track and field) at the 2003 All-Africa Games
Athletes (track and field) at the 2007 All-Africa Games
21st-century Burkinabé people